Living the Life is a British television talk show that features unmoderated conversations between two celebrities.  It represents a divergence from the standard interviewer-subject talk show format.  Living the Life airs on UK's Sky Arts network.

Format
The hour-long talk show provides a unique take on the genre by allowing the two guest celebrities to converse freely without an interviewer.  In these conversations, the celebrities discuss how emotional experiences from their childhood, their early career, the onset of success and their subsequent journey through wealth and fame has shaped their lives. They also discuss their achievements and the effects of living life in the public eye.

The main hook of Living The Life is that, unlike the traditional interview formula, the participants, bonded by mutual accomplishment, chat to each other from a place of mutual respect and admiration and they relax into an intimate and unreserved exchange.

Production

Season 1
Living the Life is a production of Back Door Productions.  Executive Producer Rosemary Reed and Director Jules Williams produce the show out of their Pinewood Studios location.  The first season premiered on 6 November 2011, and ran for 10 consecutive weeks.

Season 1 of Living the Life was released on DVD exclusively through Tesco Entertainment.  The DVD set included four bonus episodes and an accompanying behind-the-scenes book, Living the Life written by director Jules Williams.

Living the Life has also been made available via UK based video on demand website Blinkbox, where episodes (including the four DVD-only episodes) can be downloaded individually. DVD box set.

Season 2
Living the Life returned for a second season that debuted in October 2012 on Sky Arts.

Episodes
, Living the Life has produced 23 episodes, including four episodes available only online or on DVD.

Series 1

Series 1 – Exclusive DVD Episodes

Series 2

Series 3

References

External links
 
 

2011 British television series debuts
2013 British television series endings
Sky UK original programming
British television talk shows
English-language television shows